Ahmed Mohamed ag Hamani (born 1942) was the prime minister of Mali from 2002 to 2004.

Life and career
Hamani was born in Goundam, and is an ethnic Tuareg. He became a technical advisor to the Minister of Planning in 1975 before entering the government on January 7, 1978, as Minister for the Supervision of Companies and State Enterprises. He then became Minister of Information and Telecommunications in the government named on June 28, 1979 and Minister of Planning in the government named on August 2, 1980; in the latter position, he became the second ranking person in the government after Moussa Traoré, who was President and Minister of Defense. He subsequently became Minister of Sports, Arts and Culture on December 31, 1984, and then Minister of Transport and Public Works on June 6, 1986. He left the government on January 20, 1987 and became High Commissioner of the Organization for the Development of the Senegal River, in which post he remained until 1992. In 1993, he was named Ambassador to Morocco by President Alpha Oumar Konaré; after six years in that post, he became Ambassador to Belgium, the Netherlands, the United Kingdom, Luxembourg, and the European Union.

He served there until he was named Prime Minister by Amadou Toumani Touré on June 9, 2002, after Touré took office following his victory in that year's presidential election, and his government was named on June 14. His initial appointment was regarded as being on a temporary basis extending through the period of the July 2002 parliamentary election. After the election, he was reappointed on October 12, 2002, with a new government being named on October 16. At Touré's request, he submitted his government's resignation on April 28, 2004, and Ousmane Issoufi Maïga was appointed as Prime Minister on April 29.

References

1942 births
Living people
Ambassadors of Mali to Morocco
Ambassadors of Mali to Belgium
Ambassadors of Mali to the Netherlands
Ambassadors of Mali to the United Kingdom
Ambassadors of Mali to Luxembourg
Ambassadors of Mali to the European Union
People from Tombouctou Region
Malian diplomats
Tuareg people
21st-century Malian people